The Nandi Award for Best Makeup Artist winners:Since 1991

References

Makeup Artist
Film awards for makeup and hairstyling